Maurice Omondi Odumbe (born  15 June 1969) is a former Kenyan cricketer and a former ODI captain for Kenya. Odumbe was suspended from cricket in August 2004 after he allegedly received money from bookmakers. He was appointed the coach of the Kenya national cricket team in April 2018. However, he was replaced as national coach by David Obuya in October 2018.

School time
Born in Nairobi, Odumbe attended Dr Aggrey Primary School and Upper Hill secondary school, where the right-handed batsman and right-arm offbreak bowler showed aptitude for cricket.

Domestic career
Odumbe made his first-class debut in 1998 when Kenya played the touring England A side, making 16 and taking 0/29, and continued to play well for his local Nairobi side, the Aga Khan club. 

In the year 2004, he hit a career best first-class score of 207 against the Leeward Islands.

International career
Odumbe made his debut for Kenya on 4 June 1990 against Bangladesh at Amstelveen at the ICC Trophy, scoring 41 and taking 1/26, and had become one of their leading players by Kenya's One Day International (ODI) debut at the 1996 Cricket World Cup. Odumbe won the Man of the Match Award in one of cricket's biggest shocks, taking 3 for 14 in Kenya's win over West Indies.

Odumbe was appointed national captain prior to the 1999 Cricket World Cup, winning a Man of the Match award against Sri Lanka for his 82 off 95 deliveries. Passed over for captaincy for Steve Tikolo for the 2003 Cricket World Cup, Odumbe played well as Kenya made the semi-final as well against India.

Ban
In March 2004, Odumbe was investigated by the International Cricket Council following allegations of possible match-fixing and was found guilty in August 2004 of receiving money from bookmakers and banned from cricket for five years. While commentators at the time believed that the suspension would end his career, Odumbe has stated that he plans to return to cricket once the suspension ends. Odumbe has played 61 ODI matches, scoring 1409 runs at 26.09 and taking 39 wickets at 46.33, and 17 first-class matches, scoring 894 runs at 34.34 and taking 40 wickets at 19.55.

Returned to Cricket

He returned to competitive cricket at domestic level in August 2009, aged 40.

Beyond cricket
Odumbe has been heavily involved in fundraising for shelters for AIDS orphans, as well as presenting a weekly radio sports programme and appearing in a number of television commercials. He was also planning to release a song and stood as a candidate for the National Democratic Development Union in the Kenyan general election of 2007.

See also
List of cricketers banned for match fixing

References

External links
 Nato, K. (2007) "Rebranded Odumbe Now Playing Different Ball Game", The Nation, Nairobi, 17 March 2007.
 Williamson, M. (2004) "Maurice Odumbe", Cricinfo, Accessed 7 April 2007.

1969 births
Living people
Cricketers from Nairobi
Kenyan cricketers
Kenya One Day International cricketers
Kenyan cricket captains
Cricketers at the 1996 Cricket World Cup
Cricketers at the 1998 Commonwealth Games
Cricketers at the 1999 Cricket World Cup
Cricketers at the 2003 Cricket World Cup
Sportspeople involved in betting scandals
Commonwealth Games competitors for Kenya
Cricketers banned for corruption